Flipz is a type of confectionery created by Nestlé in 1997, consisting of salted pretzels covered in chocolate and other coatings.

Originally produced by Nestle in 1997 and made with Rold Gold pretzels, the brand was purchased by DeMet's Candy Company in 2003 and has been produced under DeMet's ownership since that time. DeMet's has added a number of additional flavors to the original Milk Chocolate flavor. In 2013, DeMet's was sold to Yıldız Holding.

TV commercials for Flipz began in 1997 with the tagline "What's Your Excuse?" The first spot featured an unnamed woman eating Flipz, while later ads featured Greg Lee, known for his prior role as host of the half-hour PBS children's game show Where in the World is Carmen Sandiego?, promoting the snack.

Flipz are also produced in the United Kingdom for the UK and Ireland market by United Biscuits.

Flavors

 Milk Chocolate
 Dark Chocolate
 White Fudge
 Birthday Cake
 Caramel Sea Salt
 Strawberry Cheesecake
 Peanut Butter
 Cookies and Cream
 Gingerbread

Limited Flavors 
 Chocolate Mint
 S’mores
 Candy Cane
 Strawberry
 Unicornz "Purple Fudge Covered Pretzels Drizzled with Magic"
 Double Dipped Peanut Butter and Chocolate
 Pumpkin Spice Covered Pretzels

References

External links
US product page

British snack foods
Pretzels